Candice Kristina Patton is an American actress. She is best known for her role as Iris West-Allen in the television series The Flash (2014–2023), which earned her a Saturn Award from four nominations.

Early life 
Patton was raised in Plano, Texas. She attended Southern Methodist University in Dallas, graduating with a BFA in Theatre.

Career 
In May 2004, following her first year in university, Patton took part in CBS' Soap Star Screen Test, a nationwide audition contest for university students to win a role on the soap opera The Young and the Restless. Patton won the contest alongside Ethan Rains. In 2008, Patton had a starring role in The WB's web series Sorority Forever and a role in the independent film Commander and Chief. 

Patton was cast for many television series including the soap opera The Bold and the Beautiful. She currently portrays Iris West in The Flash for The CW since 2014. The role has led to appearances on other Arrowverse shows including Arrow, Supergirl and Legends of Tomorrow for the Crisis on Earth-X crossover event. In the third-season episode "Duet", she played Millie Foss, the daughter of gangsters, in a dreamworld scenario.

In 2017, her role as Iris West garnered her a Saturn Award for Best Supporting Actress on Television.

Charity work 
In 2017, along with her Arrowverse co-stars Patton co-founded Shethority ("She + Authority"), an online global collective described as "a positive place for women and the feminine to inspire, empower, and share." Active members of the initiative include Melissa Benoist, Nicole Maines, Chyler Leigh, Caity Lotz, Maisie Richardson-Sellers, Tala Ashe, Emily Bett Rickards, Juliana Harkavy, Katie Cassidy and Danielle Panabaker. Through social media, women share their own stories and experiences on dealing with self-acceptance, homophobia, sexual harassment at the workplace and so on. Shethority has its own clothing line, from which all the money collected will be donated to non-profit organizations fighting for girls and women rights, such as Girls Not Brides and Girls, Inc..

In May and June 2019, Patton, DC Comics Co-Publisher Jim Lee, writer Tom King, and fellow CW series actresses Nafessa Williams and Danielle Panabaker toured five U.S. military bases in Kuwait with the United Service Organizations (USO), where they visited the approximately 12,000 U.S. military personnel stationed in that country as part of DC's 80th anniversary of Batman celebration.

Filmography

Awards and nominations

Notes

References

External links 

 
 

Living people
People from Plano, Texas
American soap opera actresses
American television actresses
American film actresses
Southern Methodist University alumni
Actresses from Texas
21st-century American actresses
African-American actresses
Year of birth missing (living people)
21st-century African-American women
21st-century African-American people